Păuna Greceanu-Cantacuzino (died 1740), was a Princess consort of Wallachia by marriage to Ștefan Cantacuzino (r. 1714–1716).

She is described as ambitious and dominant and actively involved in the foreign policy and actions regarding the deposition of the former prince and the installation of her spouse to the throne. After having entered into negotiations with the Habsburgs, however, the Ottomans deposed her spouse, and he was taken to Constantinople and executed.

References
 George Marcu (coord.), Enciclopedia personalităților feminine din România, Editura Meronia, București, 2012

1740 deaths
18th-century Romanian people
Royal consorts of Wallachia
Year of birth missing
18th-century Romanian women